Orazio di Giampaolo Baglioni (1493 in Perugia – 22 May 1528) was an Italian lord and condottiero. He took over command of Giovanni de' Medici's Black Bands after his death in 1526. Pope Clement VII held him responsible for the unrest in Perugia and imprisoned him in Castel Sant'Angelo in Rome. However, during the siege of Rome in 1527 prior to its sack, Clement put Orazio in charge of the city's defences. He died in an ambush during the Siege of Naples.

References

16th-century condottieri
1493 births
1528 deaths
People from Perugia
Military leaders of the Italian Wars